Piercolias is a Neotropical genus of butterflies in the family Pieridae. The name Piercolias was introduced by Augustus Radcliffe Grote as a replacement for Trifurcula Staudinger, 1894, which is invalid under the Principle of Homonymy.

Species
Piercolias coropunae (Dyar, 1913)
Piercolias forsteri Field & Herrera, 1977
Piercolias huanaco (Staudinger, 1894)

References

Pierini
Pieridae of South America
Pieridae genera
Taxa named by Augustus Radcliffe Grote